Hovenkamp is a surname of Dutch origin. Notable people with the surname include:

Eva Hovenkamp (born 1996), Dutch sprinter
Herbert Hovenkamp (born 1948), American legal academic
Hugo Hovenkamp (born 1950), Dutch footballer

See also
Hogenkamp

Surnames of Dutch origin